Deodoro Station is a railway station in the West Zone of Rio de Janeiro that serves as the terminal of the Deodoro Line. It is also on the Santa Cruz and Japeri lines.

History 
The station was opened in 1859 and was initially known as Sapopemba. It was part of the Mangaratiba branch of the Estrada de Ferro Central do Brasil.

The current name was adopted in the early 1900s in honour of Deodoro da Fonseca, the first president of Brazil.

Access
The station provides access to the Deodoro Olympic Park, which hosted events at the 2016 Summer Olympics.

Sources
 Max Vasconcellos: Vias Brasileiras de Comunicação, 1928

References

SuperVia stations